Popweeed may refer to:

Fucus, a genus of seaweed
Various plants in the family Brassicaceae, with seed pods that pop, especially:
Cardamine, a large genus of flowering plants in the mustard family
Lesquerella, a defunct species name